The Arava Stream (Nahal HaArava)  is an intermittent stream (occasionally flowing in the rainy, winter season) that flows from the approximate mid-point of the Arava desert in Israel's Southern District northward. It is 89 km long, and in many parts, serves as the actual border between Israel and Jordan. The stream originates on the crest of the Notza Ridge, which forms the watershed divide between the Dead Sea and the Red Sea, and from which all streams in the Arava desert flow either north to the Dead Sea or south to the Red Sea. The stream's prominent tributaries include: Nahal Paran, Nahal Barak, Nahal Tzin, Nahal Tzafit, and Nahal Nekorot. In addition to Israel and Jordan, parts of its drainage basin are in the Sinai Peninsula, Egypt.

Northern flow
The stream flows into the area of evaporation ponds  in what used to be the southernmost end of the Dead Sea and divides these ponds into the Israel area (managed by the Dead Sea Works) and the Jordan area. It enters the evaporation area and on exit it drains the brine into the Dead Sea, together with the parallel brine drain channel. After the Dead Sea basin was severed into the Northern and Southern parts, the area between them turned into dry seabed. It is a dangerous area due to sinkholes and land miness, and the entrance there is prohibited.  The banks of the Arava Stream (and the brine channel) had become eroded in the area, end the continued erosion endangers the stability of the evaporation ponds. Also the seasonal floods of the stream present danger to the chemical plants in the Mount Sodom area.

The correspondent of Kan 11 TV channel Oren Aharoni wrote a series of articles about the northern path of the Arava Stream and dubbed it a new "secret river" because it is mostly unknown to the general public.

References

External links

Rivers of Israel
Rivers of Jordan